MermaidFX is a company that creates mermaid tails and other aquatic costumes for television shows, films, commercials and individuals. Their prosthetic mermaid tail rentals have been most widely seen in the Hercules: The Legendary Journeys television series worn by actors Angela Dotchin and Michael Hurst.

Production history
MermaidFX was founded in 2001 by photographer and costume designer Jove deRenzy with Debbie Pelfrey working as the company's head seamstress. The company opened their official website in 2004.

MermaidFX also does business under the trademark name MerTails LLC.

References

Mass media companies established in 2001
Visual effects companies